Several mountains in Austria bear the name Wildkarspitze:

 Wildkarspitze (Zillertal Alps), a mountain in the Zillertal Alps of Salzburg state
 Wildkarspitze (Stubai Alps), a mountain in the Stubai Alps of Tyrol
 Wildkarspitze (Kitzbühel Alps), a mountain in the Kitzbühel Alps of Tyrol